Jerry Charles Dockham is a former Republican member of the North Carolina General Assembly, who represented the state's 80th House district, including constituents in Davidson County. Dockham served 11.5 full terms in the North Carolina House of Representatives. He is a former insurance professional for Nationwide from Denton, North Carolina.

Education
Rep. Dockham graduated from Denton High School in 1968. In 1972, Rep. Dockham, earned his Bachelor of Science Degree from Wake Forest University.

Personal life
Jerry is married to Louise S. Dockham, a teacher assistant at Denton Elementary School. Jerry and Louise have two sons. Both Jerry and Louise Dockham are natives of Denton and graduated from Denton High School together.

North Carolina House of Representatives
Jerry is consistently ranked in the top 10% of the 120 members of the North Carolina House of Representatives. In 1998, Rep. Dockham was chosen as Legislator of the Year by the N.C. Society of Anesthesiologists.

Dockham resigned his seat on July 1, 2013 after his appointment to the North Carolina Utilities Commission.

Electoral history

2012

2010

2008

2006

2004

2002

2000

References

External links

|-

|-

Living people
1950 births
People from Denton, North Carolina
Wake Forest University alumni
20th-century American politicians
21st-century American politicians
Republican Party members of the North Carolina House of Representatives